Idir Abdullah Khourta (born July 26, 1986 in Sète, France) is a French-born Algerian table tennis player. As of February 2013, Khourta is ranked no. 522 in the world by the International Table Tennis Federation (ITTF). Khourta is a member of the table tennis team for Fréjus Sports Club, and is coached and trained by Eric Angles. He is also left-handed, and uses the classic grip and Yasaka Offensif 40 blade.

Representing his adopted nation Algeria, Khourta qualified for the men's singles tournament at the 2008 Summer Olympics in Beijing, by receiving a place as one of the top 8 seeded players from the 2007 All-Africa Games in Algiers. He lost the preliminary round match to Australia's William Henzell, with a final set score of 1–4.

References

External links
 
 NBC 2008 Olympics profile

1986 births
Living people
Algerian male table tennis players
Table tennis players at the 2008 Summer Olympics
Olympic table tennis players of Algeria
People from Sète
Competitors at the 2007 All-Africa Games
African Games competitors for Algeria
21st-century Algerian people
French table tennis players
French sportspeople of Algerian descent
Sportspeople from Hérault